Gordon Eugene Hines (October 30, 1929 – November 18, 2007) was an inventor of hard-bearing balancing machines and other balancing technologies.

Biography
Gordon Eugene Hines was born in Chicago, Illinois to Mabel (McMillan) and Rufus Hines who were originally from Nova Scotia, Canada.   His father and his uncle, Robert Hines (father of Gerald D. Hines), emigrated to the United States when jobs became scarce in Canada.  His mother and sister both died when he was four, and his father later married Margaret Morrison, who helped raise him.

Following graduation from William Howard Taft High School (Chicago) in 1948, he enlisted in the United States Army.  He continued serving in the Army Reserve while attending the University of Illinois at Urbana–Champaign, where he completed a B.S. in Liberal Arts & Sciences in 1956.  While in Chicago he was secretary of the Wilson Avenue YMCA, bike raced in Chicago, IL, and Kenosha Park in Wisconsin, sang professionally with the Chicago Symphony Orchestra Chorus, and was active in Inter-Varsity Christian Fellowship.  He married Mavis Offner on November 15, 1958.

Mr. Hines began his career working for Allen Bagge and Ralph T. Buscarello at Electronic Dynamic Balancing Company (EDBCO), selling Stewart-Warner driveshaft balancing machines to the automotive industry. Based on feedback from customers, Mr. Hines made requests to Stewart-Warner for modifications to the machine design, but the company was not willing to make his requested changes. So he started Balance Products with Mr. Bagge and they began modifying the Stewart-Warner machines and re-selling them.  In November, 1965 Messrs. Hines and Bagge were co-awarded a patent for automatic centering of parts.

In 1964, Mr. Hines moved to Ann Arbor, Michigan, with his family, which now included three daughters, so that he could have his own Stewart-Warner sales territory.  Shortly after the move Messrs. Hines and Bagge dissolved Balance Products.  In 1968 Mr. Hines incorporated Balance Technology, Inc.  While with Balance Technology, he was awarded four more patents.

In 1979, Mr. Hines left Balance Technologies and he incorporated his second company, Hines Industries.  His first office space at Hines Industries was a work area he built in his garage.  During the next 17 years, he was awarded or co-awarded 17 more patents by the U.S. Patent and Trademark Office (Inventor: Hines, Gordon), the first two of which relate to new ideas for hard-bearing balancing machines.  Hines Industries is still owned by the Hines family and headquarters are located at 240 Metty Drive in Ann Arbor.

Mr. Hines was an avid private pilot, was a member of Measure For Measure Men's Chorus, Cantata Singers, and Barbershop Quartet, and played volleyball and ice hockey regularly until he was 70.  He died on November 18, 2007.

References

External links
 HinesIndustries.com

1929 births
2007 deaths
20th-century American businesspeople
American people of British descent
People from Chicago
University of Illinois Urbana-Champaign alumni